Cyprididae is "the most diverse group of freshwater ostracods". It contains over 1000 species, which represents 50% of the known species of freshwater ostracods (other speciose families include Candonidae, with 25%, and Limnocytheridae, with 10%). Around 60% of genera in the family are endemic to a single zoogeographic region. The family contains 16 subfamilies, and is most diverse in the Afrotropical realm, with over 300 species in 45 genera. Many Cyprididae occur in temporary water bodies and have drought-resistant eggs, mixed/parthenogenetic reproduction and ability to swim. These biological attributes pre-adapt them to form successful radiations in these habitats. Bennelongia is an interesting of the family Cyprididae. It may be the last true descendant of the Mesozoic (and now extinct) lineage of Cypridea, which was a dominant lineage of ostracod in non-marine waters in the Cretaceous.

Taxonomy 
The following genera are recognised in the family Cyprididae:
 

Afrocypris 
Arctocypris 
Ampullacypris 
Bennelongia 
Bradleystrandesia 
Bradleytriebella 
Brasacypris 
Candocypria 
Candonocypris 
Chlamydotheca 
Cypretta 
Cypria
Cypridopsis 
Cyprinotus 
Cypris 
Cypricercus 
Diacypris 
Dolerocypris 
Eucypris
Herpetocypris
Heterocypris 
Hungarocypris 
Ilyocypris 
Kroemmelbeincypris 
Kunluniacypris 
Martenscypridopsis 
Microcypris 
Mishinaella 
Mongolianella 
Neocypridopsis 
Ngarawa 
Pattersoncypris 
Potamocypris 
Pseudocypridopsis 
Pseudoeucypris 
Reticypris 
Ryocypris 
Sarscypridopsis 
Strandesia 
Tanycypris 
Tucanocypris 
Zonocypretta 
Zonocypris

References

External links 
 

 
Ostracod families